"74–75" is a song by American band the Connells from their fifth studio album, Ring (1993). The acoustic ballad was released as the album's third single in 1993, but it did not chart in the United States. It would later become a European hit for the band in 1995, reaching the top 10 in a total of 11 European countries and peaking at  1 in Norway and Sweden. It also charted in the top 20 of the United Kingdom. Since the Connells never had another hit, they are widely seen as a one-hit wonder.

In the song, singer Mike Connell nostalgically reflects on the passing of time and how people he used to know have changed now. The music video, directed by Mark Pellington, features students from Needham B. Broughton High School's Class of 1975 and compares the photographs from their yearbook, with how they look and have aged since then.

Critical reception
James Masterton described "74–'75" as a "gently strummed song" in his weekly UK chart commentary in Dotmusic. A reviewer from Music Week rated it three out of five, adding, "Commercially alternative with a capital C, this laid-back, rootsy, countrified single drifts through the ears pretty agreeably. Expect a positive response from nostalgic radio programmers." Rob Ross of Popdose called it "emotionally-charged and poignant." Michael Hamm of The Guardian said the song was a "masterful piece of mass market soft-pop songwriting." American magazine Trouser Press described it as "so sweet [it] borders on cloying".

Chart performance
"74–'75" became a hit in Europe in 1995, particularly in Sweden and Norway, where it topped the singles charts. In Belgium, Denmark, France, Iceland, and Switzerland, it reached the top five. In Germany, the song peaked at No. 7 and remained on the chart for 28 weeks. The single also reached the top 10 in Austria, Ireland, and the Netherlands. "74–'75" was the band's only top-20 hit in the United Kingdom, where it peaked at No. 14 in August 1995. In March 1996, the single re-appeared on the UK Singles Chart at No. 21. The song ended 1995 as Europe's 23rd-best-performing song, climbing to No. 8 on the Eurochart Hot 100. Following the songs's success, the Connells embarked on a European tour with Def Leppard.

Music video
The accompanying music video for the song was directed by Mark Pellington. It was shot at Needham B. Broughton High School in the band's hometown Raleigh, North Carolina in 1993, and features members of the Class of 1975, juxtaposing yearbook pictures with footage of the same people as they appeared in 1993. On November 14, 2015, to mark the 40th anniversary of the 1974–1975 class, a remixed video of the song was released, showing the class members as they looked 22 years after the original video was released.

Formats and track listings
7-inch single
A. "74–'75" – 4:36
B. "New Boy" (live at the Purple Dragon Studio in Atlanta, GA) – 4:44

French CD single
"74–'75" (album version) – 4:36
"Logan Street" – 3:39

European maxi-CD single
"74–'75" (album version) – 4:36
"Logan Street" – 3:39
"Fun & Games" (live at the Purple Dragon Studio in Atlanta, GA) – 3:07
"New Boy" (live at the Purple Dragon Studio in Atlanta, GA) – 4:44

UK cassette single
"74–'75" – 4:36
"New Boy" (live at the Purple Dragon Studio in Atlanta, GA) – 4:44

Credits and personnel
Credits are lifted from the European maxi-CD single and the Ring album booklet.

Studios
Recorded in March 1993 at Dreamland Studios (Bearsville, New York)
Mixed in April 1993 at Carriage House Studios (Stamford, Connecticut)
Mastered at Sterling Sound (New York City)

The Connells
Mike Connell – music, words, vocals, guitar
David Connell – bass
George Huntley – vocals, guitar, mandolin
Doug MacMillan – vocals, guitar
Peele Wimberley – drums, percussion
Steve Potak – piano, organ, keyboards
The Connells – production

Recording and production
Lou Giordano – production, mixing
David Cook – engineering

Charts

Weekly charts

Year-end charts

Certifications

Influence
Fran Healy of Scottish band Travis has said that he wrote "Writing to Reach You" while listening to "74–75" on the radio.

See also
List of number-one songs in Norway
List of number-one singles and albums in Sweden

References

Songs about nostalgia
Songs about teenagers
Songs about old age
1990s ballads
1993 singles
1993 songs
1995 singles
The Connells songs
Music videos directed by Mark Pellington
Number-one singles in Norway
Number-one singles in Sweden